Bishara, Bechara or Beshara (بشارة) is a common Arabic and Coptic name in the Middle East. It’s found most commonly in Egypt, Iraq and Syria. In Arabic, Bishāra means “Good News” an Arabic word which is the equivalent to Greek εὐαγγέλιον, meaning “The Gospel”. As such, bearers of this surname are predominantly Christian. 

It is also a Swahili and Borana name  as it means "Happy tidings" The spelling "Bechara" is more common in South America and Southern Italy. Bishara in its various forms may refer to:

Mononym
Bishara (singer) (born 2003), Swedish singer of Syrian origin
Bechara Effendi, real name Manouk Avedissian (1841–1925), Ottoman administrator and the chief engineer of the Vilayet of Syria and later of the Vilayet of Beirut

Given name

Bishara
Bishara Merhej (born 1946), Lebanese journalist and politician
Bishara Wakim (1890–1949), Egyptian film director and actor

Bechara
Béchara Abou Mrad, Melkite priest and monk
Bechara Choucair, Lebanese American administrator in medical fields and public health
Beshara Doumani (born 1957), American historian and political writer
Bechara El Khoury (1890–1964), President of Lebanon
Bechara El Khoury (composer) (born 1957), Lebanese composer
Bechara Oliveira (born 1976), Brazilian footballer
Bechara Boutros al-Rahi (born 1940), 77th Maronite Patriarch of Antioch, and head of the Maronite Church since 2011

Middle name
Sirhan Sirhan (Sirhan Bishara Sirhan) (born 1944), Palestinian assassin of Robert Kennedy

Surname

Bishara
Abdullah Bishara (born 1936), Kuwaiti diplomat and politician
Amal Bishara, Israeli Palestinian doctor
Azmi Bishara (born 1956), Palestinian Arab author and politician
Joseph Bishara (born 1970), American composer, music producer and actor
Marwan Bishara, Palestinian Israeli journalist
Roberto Bishara (born 1981), Chilean footballer of Palestinian descent
Samir Bishara (1935–2010), Egyptian orthodontist

Bechara
Flavia Bechara, Lebanese actress
Hassan Bechara (1945–2017), Lebanese wrestler
Souha Bechara (born 1967), Lebanese national figure. Attempted to assassinate General Antoine Lahad of the South Lebanon Army

Beshara
Brian Beshara (born 1977), Lebanese basketball player
Khairy Beshara (born 1947), Egyptian film director

Others
 Beshara (band), British reggae band
 Ek Bechara, 1972 Bollywood action drama film
 Mr. Bechara, 1996 Bollywood romantic drama film directed by K. Bhagyaraj
 "Bishara", a song from the Tom Skinner album Voices of Bishara

See also
Bashir / Basheer / Bachir